Lunadei is an Italian surname. Notable people with the surname include:

Gianni Lunadei (1938–1998), Italian-born Argentine actor
Lorenzo Lunadei (born 1997), Sammarinese footballer

Italian-language surnames